The 1964 Yukon general election was held on 8 September 1964 to elect the seven members of the Yukon Territorial Council. The council was non-partisan and had merely an advisory role to the federally appointed Commissioner.

Members elected

References

1964
1964 elections in Canada
Election
September 1964 events in Canada